The Lazy Line Painter Jane box set was a re-release of Belle & Sebastian's 1997 EPs Dog on Wheels, Lazy Line Painter Jane and 3.. 6.. 9 Seconds of Light. The release contained original pressings of the CD versions of the three EPs in a card slipcase with new artwork. The slipcase was also available to purchase via the band's record label, Jeepster, for anyone who already owned the releases.

Track listing
(all songs written by Belle & Sebastian)

Dog On Wheels (disc 1) 
 "Dog on Wheels"
 "The State I Am In"
 "String Bean Jean"
 "Belle & Sebastian"

Lazy Line Painter Jane (disc 2) 
 "Lazy Line Painter Jane"
 "You Made Me Forget My Dreams"
 "Photo Jenny"
 "A Century of Elvis"

3.. 6.. 9 Seconds of Light (disc 3) 
 "A Century of Fakers"
 "Le Pastie de la Bourgeoisie"
 "Beautiful"
 "Put the Book Back on the Shelf""

Belle and Sebastian compilation albums
2000 compilation albums